S gol v rukata... (With Naked ... in Hand) is the third studio album by the Bulgarian rock band Hipodil, released in 1996 under the Riva Sound label. The album marks a slight departure from the established musical style of the group, with many experiments and new influences including plenty of ska motifs. The most important change however was the lack of openly "funny" songs which probably was provoked by the deteriorating economic situation in Bulgaria, the galloping inflation and the rise in the organised crime at the time. S gol v rukata... never reached the success of Hipodil's previous effort Nekuf ujas, nekuf at or of their next album Nadurveni vuglishta.

The Music 
Though the album lacks the freshness and the humorous flavour of Hipodil's other releases, some of the tracks, like "Drashtya s nokti", "Kato Slunce" and "Sprete ni toka" offer the band's trademark puns, parodies and mockery. "3X3" parodies the pop-folk, also known as chalga, quite popular in Bulgaria. 
"Aferata 'Drayfus'" deals with alcohol-inflicted vomiting and the title is a pun - an out-of-context use of the name of the Dreyfus Affair as the name Dreyfus in Bulgarian sounds similar to the slang verb "drayfam", which means "to vomit". The final track "Nova gratzka pesen" features a tango rhythm mixed with heavy guitars and very cynical lyrics.

Tracks 

 Balada za bratyata Holik (Ballad of the 'Holic Brothers)
 Triper (Gonorrhoea)
 Ovtzi (Sheep)
 S gol v rukata...noj (With Naked...Knife in Hand)
 Kato Sluntze (Like a Sun)
 Iska mi se... (I Would Like to...)
 Sprete ni toka (Shut Down the Current)
 3X3
 Drashtya s nokti (Crabing With Nails)
 Chlen (Dick)
 Detskata gradina (The Kindergarten)
 Aferata "Drayfus" (The "Dreyfus" Affair, the title is a pun meaning "throwing up")
 Bremenskite muzikanti (The Bremen Musicians)
 Nova gratzka pesen (New Town Song)

Personnel 

 Svetoslav Vitkov - vocals
 Petar Todorov - guitars
 Ventzi Basistcheto - bass guitar
 Lacherzar Marinov - drums

External links
 'S gol v rukata... at Discogs

Hipodil albums
1996 albums